Manuel Mujica Lainez (11 September 1910 – 21 April 1984) was an Argentine novelist, essayist and art critic.

He is mainly known for his cycle of historical novels called "La saga porteña" (The Buenos Aires Saga), consisting of Los ídolos (1953), La casa (1954), Los viajeros (1955) and Invitados en El Paraíso (1957); as well as his cycle of historical fantasy novels consisting of Bomarzo (1962), El unicornio (1965) and El laberinto (1974). He is also known for his first two short story collections Aquí vivieron (1949) and Misteriosa Buenos Aires (1950).

Life

His parents belonged to old and aristocratic families, being descended from the founder of the city, Juan de Garay, as well as from notable men of letters of 19th century Argentina, such as Florencio Varela and Miguel Cané. As was traditional at the time, the family spent protracted periods in Paris and London so that Manuel, known proverbially and famously as "Manucho", could become proficient in French and English. He completed his formal education at the Colegio Nacional de San Isidro, later dropping out of law school.

In spite of their proud ancestry, the Mujica Lainez family was not notably well-off by this time, and he went to work at Buenos Aires' newspaper La Nación as literary and art critic. This permitted him to marry in 1936, his bride being a beautiful patrician girl, Ana de Alvear, descended from Carlos María de Alvear. They had two sons (Diego and Manuel) and a daughter (Ana). 1936 was also the year of the 25-year-old's first publication, Glosas castellanas.

Mujica Lainez was a member of the Argentine Academy of Letters and the Academy of Fine Arts. In 1982 he received the French's Legion of Honor. He died at his Villa "El Paraíso" (The Paradise) in Cruz Chica, Córdoba Province, in 1984.

Career
Mujica Lainez was preeminently a narrator and enumerator of Buenos Aires, from its earliest colonial times to the present. The society of Buenos Aires, especially high society, its past triumphs and present decadence, its quirks and geographies, its language and lies, its sexual vanities and dreams of love: he relished bringing all this to his elegantly written, quietly ironic, subtly subversive page. 
He was also a great translator. He translated Shakespeare's Sonnets and works by Racine, Molière, Marivaux, and others.

Throughout his career he received certain honors and awards, including Ordre des Arts et des Lettres
(1964), the distinction of Commander of Order of Merit of the Italian Republic (1967) given by the Italian government and the Legion of Honour by the French government (1982). In 1964 he received the John F. Kennedy Prize for his novel Bomarzo, shared with fellow Argentine writer Julio Cortázar for his novel Hopscotch (1963).

Works

Novels
Don Galaz de Buenos Aires (1938)
The porteño saga:
Los ídolos (1952)
La casa (1954)
Los viajeros (1955)
Invitados en "El Paraíso" (1957)
Bomarzo (1962)
 El unicornio (1965) translated as The Wandering Unicorn
De milagros y de melancolías (1969)
Cecil (1972)
El laberinto (1974)
El viaje de los siete demonios (1974)
Sergio (1976)
Los cisnes (1977)
El gran teatro (1979)
El brazalete (1981)
El escarabajo (1982)

Short story collections
Aquí vivieron (1949)
Misteriosa Buenos Aires (1950)
Crónicas reales (1967)
Cuentos inéditos (posthumous, 1993)

Essays
Glosas Castellanas (1936)

Biographies
Miguel Cané (padre) (1942)
Vida de Aniceto el gallo (1943)
Vida de Anastasio el pollo (1947)

Translations
Cuarenta y nueve sonetos de Shakespeare (1962)

Collaborations
Canto a Buenos Aires (1943)
Estampas de Buenos Aires (1946)

Opera
 Mujica Lainez adapted his novel Bomarzo for the operatic stage, writing the libretto set to music by Alberto Ginastera and premièred in 1967. This opera was banned by the Argentine military dictatorship in those days.

References

Notes

Bibliography
 Carsuzán, María Emma. Manuel Mujica Lainez. Buenos Aires, Argentina: Ediciones Culturales Argentinas, Biblioteca del Sesquicentenario, Serie "Argentinos en las Letras", Ministerio de Cultura y Educación, 1962.
 Cruz, Jorge. Genio y figura de Manuel Mujica Lainez.  Buenos Aires, Argentina: Eudeba, 1978.
 Font, Eduardo. Realidad y fantasía en la narrativa de Manuel Mujica Laínez (1949–1962). Madrid, Spain: Ediciones José Porrúa Turanzas, 1976. 
 I: "Mujica Lainez y su obra literaria" 
 II: "Aquí vivieron y Misteriosa Buenos Aires: Estructura y género" 
 III: "Estructura, tiempo e imaginación en Los ídolos" 
 IV: "La estructura de La Casa" 
 V: Bomarzo: El género literario y el narrador" 
 VI: "Bomarzo: La narrativa y la temática")
 Yahni, Roberto and Pedro Orgambide (eds.) Enciclopedia de la literatura argentina. Buenos Aires, Argentina: Editorial Sudamericana, 1970.

1910 births
1984 deaths
Writers from Buenos Aires
Journalists from Buenos Aires
Argentine art critics
Argentine essayists
Argentine translators
Argentine male novelists
Argentine male short story writers
Chevaliers of the Légion d'honneur
Chevaliers of the Ordre des Arts et des Lettres
Male essayists
Argentine LGBT novelists
Argentine writers in French
English–Spanish translators
French–Spanish translators
20th-century translators
20th-century Argentine novelists
20th-century short story writers
20th-century essayists
20th-century Argentine male writers
20th-century Argentine LGBT people